The Offspring is the debut studio album by American rock band the Offspring, released on June 15, 1989, by Nemesis Records. After being out of print for years, the album was re-released by Nitro and Epitaph Records in 1995 with a different album cover. Both the re-releases on the two respective labels are nearly identical. The Offspring has rarely played any songs from this album live since the Ignition tour finished in 1994.

Background and history
After recording a demo tape in 1988, the Offspring began preparations for their first full-length album. They recorded it in March 1989 at South Coast Recording in Santa Ana, California, with Thom Wilson producing. During the sessions, the band re-recorded their early songs "I'll Be Waiting" and "Blackball", which both originally appeared on the band's 1986 single "I'll Be Waiting".

The album was released on June 15, 1989, in limited numbers by Nemesis Records, only in 12" vinyl and cassette format. When it was released, the album initially sold 5,000 copies and it took the band two and a half years to sell them all. The album's closing track "Kill the President" was met with a great deal of controversy and as a result, one of the copies was destroyed by Wally George at his show Hot Seat in 1992, thus leaving only 4,999 copies left. This song was removed from the reissues after 2001. Some copies also have the Cargo Records logo next to the Nemesis logo on the back cover. To support the album, The Offspring embarked on a six-week national tour, but Noodles was stabbed during a performance at the Hollywood anti-nuclear benefit. Following the small success of The Offspring, the band signed with Epitaph Records in 1991.

"Beheaded" was rarely ever played live, having been played at least 24 times as of July 2016. The Offspring has rarely played any songs from the rest of the album.

Reception

The Offspring received mixed reviews. AllMusic writer Stephen Thomas Erlewine, who gave the album two-and-a-half stars out of five, stated that The Offspring "is a rawer, harder-edged collection than their breakthrough set, Smash, but that doesn't necessarily mean it's a better record", and that it "lacks the metal guitar crunch that dominated Smash.".

The Offspring did not initially reach the Billboard 200 chart or become a commercial success. However, when the album was reissued in 1995, it reached a peak position of number 85 on the Netherlands Albums Chart for three weeks.

Reissues
The Offspring was reissued several times, with formats in different countries, and with different labels (see the table below). The album was reissued on CD (and again on vinyl and cassette) in 1995, a year after the Offspring's commercial success with its third studio album Smash. This version is nearly identical to the one released on Nemesis. It features a different artwork instead of the controversial "Guitar Alien" front cover artwork, designed by Marc Rude. The album was reissued once again on Nitro in 2001, with "Kill the President" omitted; according to frontman Dexter Holland, it was removed to prevent legal pressure falling upon the band and Nitro. Coinciding with Record Store Day, The Offspring was reissued in 2017 on blue translucent vinyl; like the 2001 reissue, it does not include "Kill the President".

Album covers
Two covers of this album exist. The original version features an image of a man's body exploding as the xenomorph from the Alien franchise holding a Fender Stratocaster emerges from his chest. There is a report, which remains unconfirmed, that the album was banned from retail stores due to the "grotesque" cover.

The 1995 re-release shows a different image which features a blurry black-and-white picture of a person's face. It was later admitted that the band and their studio never really liked the original cover and the re-release gave them an opportunity to change it.

The shadows on the back cover of the 1995 reissue also appear on the cover of the "I'll Be Waiting" single.

Track listing
All tracks written by Dexter Holland, except where noted.

Original pressing

CD

Notes
 Track 1, "Jennifer Lost the War", is featured on Punk-O-Rama Volume 1.
 Track 6, "Beheaded", was later re-recorded as "Beheaded (1999)" for the movie Idle Hands.
 Track 7, "Tehran", was later re-recorded as "Baghdad", which appears on their 1991 long-out of print EP Baghdad.
 Track 9, "Blackball", is featured on Tony Hawk's Pro Skater 4.
 Track 11, "Kill the President" is removed from the 2001 and 2017 issues and is replaced by four seconds of silence. On the official website, the song is not mentioned in the track list. The song is also not featured on the iTunes, Spotify or Amazon Music versions of the album.

Personnel
Adapted from The Offspring liner notes.

The Offspring
 Dexter Holland (credited as "Keith Holland" on the 1989 vinyl issue) – lead vocals, rhythm guitar (uncredited)
 Noodles – lead guitar, background vocals on "Blackball"
 Greg K. – bass, background vocals on "Blackball"
 Ron Welty – drums

Additional personnel
 Jason – backing vocals on "Blackball"
 Jeff 1 – backing vocals on "Blackball"
 Jeff 2 – backing vocals on "Blackball"
 Tyler – backing vocals on "Blackball"
 Rick – backing vocals on "Blackball"
 Michelle – backing vocals on "Blackball"
 Marvin – backing vocals on "Blackball"
 Cynthia – backing vocals on "Blackball"

Technical personnel
 Thom Wilson – producer
 Jim Dotson (credited as "Jim Oddo") – engineer
 Mad Marc Rude – Cover art (for 1989 vinyl)
 Kirk - back cover picture - (for 1989 vinyl)
 Mackie Osborne (credited as "Mackie") – Art (for reissue)

Charts

See also
 List of anti-war songs

References

Works cited

External links

The Offspring at YouTube (streamed copy where licensed)

The Offspring albums
1989 debut albums
Nitro Records albums
Epitaph Records albums
Albums produced by Thom Wilson